Saloca is a genus of sheet weavers that was first described by Eugène Louis Simon in 1926.

Species
 it contains six species, found in Europe, Russia, Nepal, Turkey, and Eastern Europe:
Saloca diceros (O. Pickard-Cambridge, 1871) (type) – Europe
Saloca elevata Wunderlich, 2011 – Turkey
Saloca gorapaniensis Wunderlich, 1983 – Nepal
Saloca khumbuensis Wunderlich, 1983 – Nepal
Saloca kulczynskii Miller & Kratochvíl, 1939 – Central, Eastern Europe
Saloca ryvkini Eskov & Marusik, 1994 – Russia

See also
 List of Linyphiidae species (Q–Z)

References

 
Araneomorphae genera
Linyphiidae
Spiders of Asia